Safefood 360, Inc. is a food safety management software company founded in Dublin, Ireland, and now headquartered in Manhattan, New York, United States. The main product of Safefood 360, Inc. is an internet-based food safety management system, which is used by food manufacturing businesses for managing food safety programs.

History 
Safefood 360° was founded by former food industry-consultant George Howlett and Philip Gillen in 2011. The company operates globally on four continents, including Europe, North America, Australia, and Africa.

Products

Food safety management software
The main product of Safefood 360° is an online-based food safety management platform that is used with the internet browser. The software is used for collecting, storing, managing, and analyzing food safety related data and documents, creating food safety audit programs, and managing a food supply chain, among other uses. According to the vendor itself, the software is aligned according to major international food safety standards, including FSNA, GFSI, ISO 22000, BRC, among others.

Software modules
 HACCP Planning
 Calibration
 Monitoring
 Management
 Utilities

Software uses
The three main uses of Safefood 360° software are: food safety management, food supply chain management, and food safety auditing. A food safety management software is typically used to replace a paper based system.

See also
 Food safety
 ISO 22000
 Global Food Safety Initiative
 Hazard analysis and critical control points

References

External links

 Safefood 360 User Guide
 Safefood 360 User Portal

Software companies based in New York City
Software companies of the United States